Weightlifting was contested by both men and women at the 2009 Southeast Asian Games in Vientiane, Laos. The Weightlifting Events were held at Pornsawan School, from 10 December to 13 December 2009, with 13 gold medals up for contention. There are six weight categories for the women and seven for the men.

Medal table

Medalists

Men

Women

Results

Men

56 Kilogram

10 December

62 Kilogram
11 December

69 Kilogram
11 December

77 Kilogram
12 December

85 Kilogram
13 December

94 Kilogram
13 December

Above 94 Kilogram
13 December

Women

48 Kilogram

10 December

53 Kilogram
11 December

58 Kilogram
11 December

63 Kilogram
12 December

69 Kilogram
12 December

Above 69 Kilogram
13 December

External links
Southeast Asian Games Official Results

2009 Southeast Asian Games events
Southeast Asian Games
2009
Weightlifting in Laos